Simona Pop née Deac (born 25 December 1988) is a retired Romanian épée fencer, bronze medallist at the 2015 European Championships, team silver medallist in the 2015 World Fencing Championships and team European champion in 2014 and 2015.

Personal life
Pop was born in Satu Mare to a Hungarian father and Romanian mother. Pop took up fencing at CS Satu Mare, one of the main fencing centres in Romania, under the coaching of Francisc Csiszar who went on to train her for twelve years.

She obtained her bacalaureat, majoring in mathematics and computer science, at the Mihai Eminescu National College. She studies accounting and information management at the Vasile Goldiș Western University of Arad.

In 2012, she married Adrian Pop, a member of Romania's national men's épée team.

Career

Pop earned a silver medal at the 2008 Junior World Championships in Acireale, then at the 2009 Summer Universiade in Belgrade. She was briefly selected into the national team during the injury of team captain Ana Maria Brânză, then served as reserve upon Brânză's return. She became Romania's number 2 in the reshuffling that followed the 2012 Summer Olympics and the retirement of Simona Gherman, Anca Măroiu, and Loredana Dinu. She also transferred to CSA Steaua București, of which national team colleagues Brânză and Maria Udrea are also members.

In the 2012–13 season Pop received a bronze team medal in the Saint-Maur World Cup, then a silver medal in the European Champion Clubs' Cup with CSA Steaua. She ranked 16th in the European Championships in Zagreb, but won a silver medal in the team event. She made it to the semi-finals in the 2013 Summer Universiade in Kazan, but was defeated by China's Sun Yiwen and took a bronze medal. At the 2013 World Championships in Budapest, she went past European silver medal Francesca Quondamcarlo, but was stopped in the table of 32 by Courtney Hurley of the United States. In the team event, Romania was defeated in semi-finals by Russia, and competed against France in the match for the third place. Entering her last leg on a 21–24 score for France, Pop equalised 25-25 against Auriane Mallo, allowing team captain Ana Brânză to win the match. Pop finished the season No.26 in World rankings, a career best as of 2014.

In the 2013–14 season Pop took a gold team medal at the Doha World Cup. At the European Championships she ceded in the first round to France's Joséphine Jacques-André-Coquin, who eventually won a bronze medal. In the team event, Romania easily prevailed over Ukraine, Pop being the main points contributor to the match. They had a tighter victory against Italy in the semi-final. In the final they met No.1 seed Russia. Pop was the first Romanian to win her bout against the Russians, allowing Brânză to equalize, then Gherman to close the match on a Romania victory. At the World Championships in Kazan, Pop was defeated by Auriane Mallo in the preliminary table of 64. In the team event Romania was stopped in the quarter-finals by Italy and finished 5th after the placement rounds.

The 2014–15 season saw the return to competition in early 2015 of Anca Măroiu and Loredana Dinu. Pop kept however her place as Romanian No.3 thanks to a solid team performance, especially at the Buenos Aires World Cup where she posted a +14 total in the semi-finals against Russia and defeated Tatiana Logunova 8–0 in the eighth relay. In May she won her first national championship after defeating teammate Anca Măroiu. In early June she reached the semifinals at the 2015 European Championships, where she lost to reigning world champion Rossella Fiamingo, and came away with a bronze medal.

Pop competed for Romania at the 2016 Summer Olympics in both the individual and team events. In the women's épée individual event, she was defeated by Leonora Mackinnon of Canada in the first round. The Romanian team won gold in the women's épée team event. Pop was the flag bearer for Romania during the closing ceremony.

References

External links

 Profile at the European Fencing Confederation

1988 births
Living people
Romanian épée fencers
Romanian female fencers
Romanian sportspeople of Hungarian descent
Sportspeople from Satu Mare
Fencers at the 2015 European Games
European Games medalists in fencing
European Games gold medalists for Romania
Olympic fencers of Romania
Fencers at the 2016 Summer Olympics
Olympic gold medalists for Romania
Olympic medalists in fencing
Medalists at the 2016 Summer Olympics
Universiade medalists in fencing
Universiade silver medalists for Romania
Universiade bronze medalists for Romania
Medalists at the 2009 Summer Universiade
Medalists at the 2013 Summer Universiade